Cryoturris citronella is a species of sea snail, a marine gastropod mollusk in the family Mangeliidae.

Description
The length of the shell attains 10.5 mm.

This marine species has a very minute brown tilted protoconch, followed by three trochoid larval whorls. The brilliant yellow spire is markedly shorter than the body whorl, with inflated whorls. The shell contains twelve transverse riblets. There is no varix, and a very faint sutural notch, while the suture is distinct and not appressed. The four larval whorls are prettily marked with transverse concave ripples.

Distribution
This species occurs in Atlantic waters, ranging from the coast of North Carolina south to the Virgin Islands; in the Caribbean Sea off Cuba in the Gulf of Mexico, the Caribbean Sea and the Lesser Antilles.

References

External links
 Rosenberg, G., F. Moretzsohn, and E. F. García. 2009. Gastropoda (Mollusca) of the Gulf of Mexico, Pp. 579–699 in Felder, D.L. and D.K. Camp (eds.), Gulf of Mexico–Origins, Waters, and Biota. Biodiversity. Texas A&M Press, College Station, Texas
 
  Tucker, J.K. 2004 Catalog of recent and fossil turrids (Mollusca: Gastropoda). Zootaxa 682: 1–1295.

citronella